The Pascagoula were an indigenous group living in coastal Mississippi.

Pascagoula may also refer to:
 Pascagoula, Mississippi – a city in the United States
 Pascagoula metropolitan area
 Pascagoula River – a river in Mississippi
 Pascagoula Parish, Louisiana - a former parish of the Territory of Orleans
 Pascagoula Abduction, an alien event
 Pascagoula station, closed intercity train station in Pascagoula, Mississippi, United States
 Naval Station Pascagoula, base of the United States Navy, in Pascagoula, Mississippi, closed in 2006